Cricket was included in the 1998 Commonwealth Games in Malaysia. This was the only time cricket was played at a Commonwealth Games until a women's tournament was included in the 2022 Commonwealth Games. Matches were played over 50 overs, and had List A status rather than full One Day Internationals. As is normal at the multisports events, the Caribbean islands that entered participated as separate nations, not as the combined West Indies team. Indeed, the Games were the first occasion on which an Antigua and Barbuda side competed at a senior level. Northern Ireland also entered, this occurrence being noteworthy because Irish cricket is usually represented by an all-island Irish cricket team.

Sixteen teams entered the competition, including seven of the nine then Test-playing nations: West Indies did not enter as mentioned above, while England declined to send a team at all, on the grounds that the September date chosen clashed with other fixtures such as the end of the County Championship.

The strength of the teams that were entered varied somewhat. Strong squads including seasoned Test and ODI players were fielded by the three nations that eventually won medals: Bronze medalists New Zealand with Stephen Fleming and Daniel Vettori, silver medalists Australia with Steve and Mark Waugh, Adam Gilchrist, Ricky Ponting, Damien Fleming and Darren Lehmann and gold medalists South Africa with Shaun Pollock, Jacques Kallis, Makhaya Ntini, Mark Boucher, and Herschelle Gibbs. India and Pakistan sent weakened teams as a result of a clash with the 1998 Sahara Cup, although India still named Sachin Tendulkar, Anil Kumble, Harbhajan Singh and VVS Laxman in its Commonwealth team while Pakistan included Shoaib Akhtar and Arshad Khan. Other notable cricketers who took part in the Commonwealth tournament included Sri Lanka's Mahela Jayawardene, Zimbabwe's Andy Flower and the West Indies' Curtly Ambrose and Richie Richardson, playing for their home country of Antigua and Barbuda under the Commonwealth format.

Competition format
All matches were played at one of six grounds in Kuala Lumpur. The 16 teams were divided into four groups of four on a seeded basis. Each team played the other three once in matches, with this round robin restricted to a single week between 9 September and 15 September. Teams scored two points for a win, one for a no-result, and none for a loss. The top team in each group went forward to the knock-out stages of semi-finals and final (plus a third-place play-off). Teams with equal numbers of points were separated on net run rate, but in the event this rule was only needed to decide the minor placings.

Teams

Squads
The following squads were named ahead of the tournament:

Group stages

Group A
Sri Lanka won all three of their games to qualify for the semi-finals. A straightforward seven-wicket victory over Malaysia (who collapsed from 87/3 to 109 all out; Sri Lanka reached 112/3) was followed by a 67-run win over Jamaica with Gunawardene hitting 107 (Sri Lanka 211/5; Jamaica 144/8), before a decider against Zimbabwe. The Africans reached 265/7 (Campbell 82, Goodwin 55); in reply, Sri Lanka stumbled to 110/5 before Hathurusingha (60) and de Saram (75*) brought them close to victory at 258/6. Streak then took three quick wickets, but the last pair survived to give Sri Lanka a one-wicket win.

In the other Group A games, Zimbabwe (144/4) beat Jamaica (142 all out) by six wickets, with an unbeaten 55 from Evans. Zimbabwe then scored 309/9 (Flower 70, Evans 59, Goodwin 53) as they crushed Malaysia (88 all out; Nkala 3–6) by 221 runs. The wooden spoon game saw Malaysia crumble to 83 all out thanks to 4–13 from Cunningham, losing by six wickets to Jamaica (87/4).

Group B
Australia scored three wins out of three in this group. First came a nine wicket win over Canada who scored only 60 all out (Fleming 4–17); the Australians made 61/1 in 14 overs. In their second match, Antigua and Barbuda were dismissed for 99; Australia made 101/3 in reply. Finally, against India, Australia scored a total of 255/5, followed by India who stuttered to 109 all out.

Antigua and Barbuda scored 164/9 (a recovery from 77/7) in a 41-over match against India, but rain fell with India 30/2 in reply and the match was declared a no-result. India's Khurasiya scored 83 against Canada in a total of 157/9, with Kumble then claiming 4–11 as the Canadians were dismissed for 45. Antigua and Barbuda (256/7) beat Canada (135 all out), with Lake making 54 before retiring hurt and then taking 4–17; Walsh also made 51 for the Antiguans.

Group C
Honours in this group went to South Africa, who started off against Northern Ireland. The Northern Irish had reached 89/5 from 38.1 overs when it rained, and the Duckworth–Lewis method was used to calculate a target of 131 from 38 overs for the South Africans, who won by making 133/6. South Africa then bowled out Bangladesh for 79 and made 80/5 for a five-wicket victory. In South Africa's final match, Barbados set 254/6 (Wallace 74), but 71 from Kallis and 54 from Gibbs saw their opponents make 257/6 with ten balls remaining.

Barbados (160/6 in 41.3 overs) beat Bangladesh (144/7 in 47 overs, Shahriar Hossain 70*) under the Duckworth–Lewis method, and then beat Northern Ireland by 176 runs. Scores of 92 from Wallace, 66 from Griffith and 60 from Campbell contributed to a score of 296/5, which the Northern Irish never got anywhere near despite Smyth's 58, scoring just 120/7. However, Northern Ireland came back well to beat Bangladesh by 114 runs: the Northern Irish made 177 (McCallan 53) before Cooke took 5–35, as Bangladesh were dismissed for 63.

Group D
One-day specialists New Zealand won all their matches in Group D, beginning with a comfortable five-wicket win over Kenya (Kenya 144/8; New Zealand 145/5) before an even more straightforward success against Scotland. The New Zealanders amassed 278/6 (Fleming 102, Parore 87), then Harris took 4–25 as Scotland could manage only 101 all out. Finally the Kiwis won the crunch match against Pakistan by 81 runs: New Zealand's 215/8 was boosted by 66 from Fleming despite Shoaib Akhtar's 4–47, but only three Pakistanis (and extras) reached double figures as they lost their last six wickets for 21 runs, being bowled out for 134 to slide to an 81-run defeat.

Pakistan had earlier been frustrated by rain against Scotland; they had scored 201/5 from their 50 overs (Akhtar Sarfraz 66*) and had reduced the Scots to 31/3 when the weather intervened. The Pakistanis did beat Kenya, however: Odoyo's 4–39 had restricted them to 189/8, but Arshad Khan's 4–14 and Javed Qadeer's five catches behind the stumps helped Pakistan to a 129-run win as they dismissed the Africans for only 60. Odumbe took 5–38 as Kenya kept Scotland down to 156/8; they then made 157/5 to win with 12.3 overs in hand.

Final group tables
Teams highlighted in yellow qualified for the semi-finals.

Knockout stage (Medal round)

Semi-finals

South Africa v Sri Lanka
A low-scoring game produced a thrilling climax. Gunawardene's 53 held the Sri Lankan innings together after they had been put in to bat by the South Africans, but Boje's 4–16 kept the Sri Lankans' score down to a distinctly unimpressive 130 as they were bowled out in 44 overs. In reply, South Africa lost wickets at regular intervals, with the highest score being opener Rindel's 25. At 96/9 all looked lost, but then Boje (20*) and Dawson (15*) compiled an unbroken stand of 35 for the last wicket to lead their team to 131/9 and a one-wicket victory.

Australia v New Zealand
A totally one-sided trans-Tasman clash saw New Zealand collapse to a feeble 58 all out after being sent in, with only captain Fleming reaching 20. Australian slow left-armer Brad Young took a hat-trick to finish with an exceptional bowling analysis of 4–2–4–4. In reply, the Australians rattled along at nearly six an over, losing only Mark Waugh as they raced to 62/1 in 10.5 overs and won easily.

Bronze-medal match
New Zealand recovered from the trauma of their semi-final thrashing to beat Sri Lanka by 51 runs. 56 not out from Harris and 56 from Astle were the main elements of a final total of 212/7 that included three run-outs. The Sri Lankans struggled to 77/7 in their innings, and though they added 53 for the eighth wicket thanks to Perera's 45, it was never likely to be enough and they were bowled out for 161.

Gold-medal match
Put in by South Africa after losing the toss, the Australians were indebted to captain Steve Waugh's unbeaten 90 as they recovered from 58/4 to post a still below-par 183 all out. Opposing captain Pollock was the chief destroyer for South Africa, with 4–19 from nine tight overs to remove Mark Waugh, Ponting, Gilchrist and Lehmann. South Africa got off to a good start in their reply with an opening partnership of 73 between Rindel (67) and Hudson (36). A burst of wickets from Lehmann (3–14) saw the South Africans wobble as they fell from 158/2 to 183/6, but the Proteas did not lose another wicket and Kallis' watchful 44 from 96 balls saw South Africa through to 184/6 and the gold medal with four overs to spare.

Final standings

Legacy
Gold medal-winning South African captain Pollock praised the Commonwealth experience while recalling his time at the Games for Cricinfo.

The success of the IPL led to a T20 tournament in the Commonwealth Games and later the Olympics being considered. The president of the Commonwealth Games federation wants to bring cricket back into the games, and the Glasgow bid for the 2014 games had indicated that they would include cricket, but it did not materialise. The ICC then rejected an offer for cricket to feature in the 2018 games on the Gold Coast, but a T20 women's tournament was held at Edgbaston for the 2022 games in Birmingham.

References

External links
Cricinfo archive on event
Cricinfo list of squads at the event

1998
1998 Commonwealth Games events
Commonwealth Games
1998